Richard Carsner (born 1948) was the Democratic party nominee for the United States House of Representatives from the 10th congressional district of North Carolina in the 2006 elections, running against incumbent Patrick McHenry.  Carsner was defeated, 62% to 38%.

Carsner resides in Catawba County, North Carolina and was employed by the Catawba County public schools, from which he retired in 2010.  He is a veteran of the United States Army.

The core of his campaign in 2006 was bringing jobs back to the 10th district, balancing the federal budget, making healthcare more affordable, improving the educational opportunities in the 10th district and elsewhere, making social security solvent for future generations, stopping illegal immigration and protecting the environment.

References

External links
 Bio from Project Vote Smart

1948 births
Living people
North Carolina Democrats